In medicine, a social history (abbreviated "SocHx") is a portion of the medical history (and thus the admission note) addressing familial, occupational, and recreational aspects of the patient's personal life that have the potential to be clinically significant.

Components
Components can include inquiries about:
 Substances
 Alcohol
 Tobacco (pack years)
 illicit drugs
 occupation
 sexual behavior (increased risk of various infections among prostitutes, people who have sex with people for money, and males engaging in anal-receptive intercourse)
 prison (especially if tuberculosis needs to be ruled out)
 travel
 exercise
 diet
 Firearms in household (especially if children or persons with cognitive impairment are present)

Relation to history

References

Medical terminology